David Wilder may refer to:

 David Wilder (baseball) (born 1960), former Major League Baseball executive
 David Wilder (activist), leader of Israeli settlers in Hebron
 David Wilder, Jr. (1778–1866), American politician in Massachusetts